Taeniotes farinosus is a species of beetle in the family Cerambycidae. It was described by Carl Linnaeus in 1758, originally under the genus Cerambyx.

Distribution
This species is known from Colombia, Brazil, Guyana, French Guiana, Suriname, Argentina, Bolivia, Costa Rica, Ecuador, Guadeloupe, Martinique, Paraguay and Peru.

Description
Body is elongate, black or dark brown, with a series of yellow-orange spots on the elytra. Antennae are filiform and rather long. Pronotum is approximately subquadrate.

Biology
This species may have two generations per year (bivoltine). Adults can be found from January to March and from September to December. These beetles feed on Artocarpus altilis (breadfruit). Larvae usually drill into wood and can cause damages.

Bibliography
Laporte Francis Louis Nompar de Caumont, Comte de Castelnau (1840) Histoire Naturelle des Insectes Coléoptères, P. Duménil, Paris 2
Linné Carl (1767) Systema Naturæ, Editio Duodecima Reformata. Laurent Salvius, Holmiæ 1 (2): 533–1327.
Ubirajara R. Martins and Antonio Santos-Silva  On some species of Taeniotes Audinet-Serville, 1835(Coleoptera: Cerambycidae: Lamiinae) Pacific Coast Entomological Society

References

External links
 Francesco Vitali Cerambycoidea
 INPN
 Cerambycids
 Lamininae

farinosus
Beetles described in 1758
Beetles of South America
Taxa named by Carl Linnaeus